Pipiza nigripilosa, the pale-haired pithead, is a common species of syrphid fly observed in the eastern United States. Hoverflies can remain nearly motionless in flight. The adults are also known as flower flies for they are commonly found on flowers, from which they get both energy-giving nectar and protein-rich pollen. Larvae when known are aphid predators.

References

Diptera of North America
Hoverflies of North America
Pipizinae
Insects described in 1887
Taxa named by Samuel Wendell Williston